Nikolaos Tzovlas was a Greek sports shooter. He competed in the 50 m pistol event at the 1948 Summer Olympics.

References

External links
  

Year of birth missing
Possibly living people
Greek male sport shooters
Olympic shooters of Greece
Shooters at the 1948 Summer Olympics
Place of birth missing
20th-century Greek people